Zhou Heyang (Traditional: 周鶴洋; Simplified: 周鹤洋; Pinyin: Zhōu Hèyáng; born June 18, 1976) is a Chinese professional Go player.

Biography 
Zhou Heyang was born in Luoyang, Henan, China. He is a Chinese professional Go player. He turned professional in 1988, and advanced to 9 dan in 2001. He started learning how to play Go at the age of 8. When he was 11, he joined the National Wei-qi Youth Team.

As A Child 
Zhou was described as being a mischievous, boisterous, opinionated and pugnacious child. He learnt Go because his father thought he'd change his behavior. He quickly progressed and improved quickly. He hated losing, and it could be seen. At the age of 10, he already achieved 4th place at the National Youth Championships. Since he was 4th in the tournament, he left home and joined the National Youth Squad in Beijing. Now he could learn about the deeper facts of Go. The team was an outstanding squad of Shao Weigang, Lui Jing, Chang Hao, Luo Xihe, Wang Lei, and Zhou himself. The problem Zhou had was that he was not like the other players. He did not go through the normal system of city or province squads. He never had those training methods. He slowly matured up after joining the team. It took him a long 18 months to finally reach the average strength of the group. He was still a very unconfident player. There was harsh criticism in the training system the team used. This is the one part Zhou had an advantage, and that was his stubbornness. Zhou was very lucky because the squad teacher, Wu Yulin, kept him with the team even though he was progressing much slower than the other teammates. Zhou would gain patience from the criticism. Now he could count a game accurately.

Growing Up 
Zhou was getting much stronger now. It was said that if he ever got ahead in a game, not even Lee Chang-ho could come back and win. This became true when he beat Lee in the 10th Fujitsu Cup before following up on beating him again in the 13th Fujitsu Cup. He is not like Lee, but he claims that both their abilities to count in the yose (end game) is above others.

Zhou finally won his first major tournament when he won the 1996 National Go Individual. He would then get entry into the next year's Fujitsu Cup, but he was blocked off by Kobayashi Koichi after beating Choi Myung-Hoon, Takemiya Masaki, and Lee Chang-ho.

Promotion record

Titles & Runners-up  

Ranks ninth in the total number of titles in China.

References 

1976 births
Living people
Chinese Go players
Sportspeople from Luoyang